"Date with Destiny" is a song by Australian pop rock band Mental As Anything, released in 1985 through WEA Records. The song was written by Guitarist Greedy Smith. The song first charted on 9 September 1985, peaked at No. 25 on the Kent Music Report, and stayed in the charts for eleven weeks. It was released as the third single from the band's fifth studio album Fundamental.

Track listing

Personnel 
 Martin Plaza — lead vocals, guitar    
 Greedy Smith — lead vocals, keyboards, harmonica
 Reg Mombassa — guitar, vocals  
 Peter O'Doherty — bass, guitar, vocals 
 Wayne de Lisle – drums

Charts

References 

Mental As Anything songs
1985 songs
1985 singles
Warner Music Group singles
Songs written by Greedy Smith
Song recordings produced by Richard Gottehrer